Mike Drass (March 15, 1961 – May 14, 2018) was an American football coach. He was the head football coach at Wesley College in Dover, Delaware from 1993 until his death in 2018.

Head coaching record

College

See also
 List of college football coaches with 200 wins

References

External links
 Wesley profile

1961 births
2018 deaths
American football offensive tackles
Mansfield Mounties football coaches
Mansfield Mounties football players
Wesley Wolverines athletic directors
Wesley Wolverines football coaches
High school football coaches in Pennsylvania
Sportspeople from Chester, Pennsylvania
Players of American football from Pennsylvania